Lochmoor Waterway Estates is an unincorporated community and census-designated place (CDP) in Lee County, Florida, United States. The population was 4,204 at the 2010 census. It is part of the Cape Coral-Fort Myers, Florida Metropolitan Statistical Area.

Geography
Lochmoor Waterway Estates is located in central Lee County at  (26.646110, -81.912958), on the west side of the tidal Caloosahatchee River, across from Fort Myers, the county seat. It is bordered to the south and west by the city of Cape Coral and to the north by unincorporated North Fort Myers.

Demographics

  
As of the census of 2000, there were 3,858 people, 1,638 households, and 1,187 families residing in the CDP. The racial makeup of the CDP was 95.70% White, 0.78% African American, 0.44% Native American, 1.40% Asian, 0.10% Pacific Islander, 0.34% from other races, and 1.24% from two or more races. Hispanic or Latino of any race were 3.55% of the population.   
   
There were 1,638 households, out of which 22.8% had children under the age of 18 living with them, 62.6% were married couples living together, 7.6% had a female householder with no husband present, and 27.5% were non-families. 21.7% of all households were made up of individuals, and 11.5% had someone living alone who was 65 years of age or older. The average household size was 2.36 and the average family size was 2.73.   
 
In the CDP, the population was spread out, with 18.3% under the age of 18, 5.5% from 18 to 24, 20.3% from 25 to 44, 31.0% from 45 to 64, and 24.9% who were 65 years of age or older. The median age was 48 years. For every 100 females, there were 92.5 males. For every 100 females age 18 and over, there were 89.2 males.

The median income for a household in the CDP was $50,987, and the median income for a family was $56,250. Males had a median income of $39,430 versus $30,366 for females. The per capita income for the CDP was $30,763. About 1.2% of families and 3.2% of the population were below the poverty line, including 3.4% of those under age 18 and 2.1% of those age 65 or over.

References

Census-designated places in Lee County, Florida
Census-designated places in Florida